The El Prado Complex is a historic district in Balboa Park in San Diego, California. The  complex includes 13 contributing buildings and one contributing structure. Most of the structures were built for San Diego's Panama-California Exposition of 1915–16 and were refurbished and re-used for the California Pacific International Exposition of 1935–36. The original architects were Bertram Goodhue and Carleton Winslow. The area was listed on the National Register of Historic Places in 1976.

Components
The complex incorporates the following:
 Cabrillo Bridge, together with its approaches and guardhouses, built over a canyon in 1915 to serve as the primary entrance to the fair and Balboa Park, virtually unchanged since
 Alcazar Garden, built for the 1915 fair as Montezuma's Gardens, renamed Alcazar Gardens for the 1935 fair
 Spreckels Organ Pavilion, built for the 1915 fair and virtually unchanged since
 Plaza de Panama, an open space surrounded by the San Diego Museum of Art, the Timken Museum of Art, the House of Hospitality and the House of Charm; originally an open pedestrian plaza; used for parking in recent decades; currently closed to parking and being converted back into a pedestrian plaza
 El Prado Arcade, a continuous covered arcade and walkway demarcated by arches; basically unchanged from 1915 except for repairs
 Botanical Building, a lath-covered structure with two reflecting pools, built for the 1915 fair and re-used essentially unchanged for the 1935 fair
 House of Charm, originally built for the 1915 fair as the Indian Arts Building, renamed the Russia and Brazil building in 1916; intended to be temporary; changed to House of Charm for the 1935 fair;  demolished in the 1990s for structural reasons and reconstructed using the original building as a model; now houses the Mingei International Museum
 House of Hospitality, originally built for the 1915 fair as the Foreign Arts Building; intended to be temporary; changed to House of Hospitality for the 1935 fair; demolished in the 1990s for structural reasons and reconstructed using the original building as a model
 Casa del Prado, originally built for the 1915 fair as the Varied Industries Building, renamed the Foreign and Domestic Industries Building in 1916; intended to be temporary; changed to Food and Beverage Building for the 1935 fair; housed the San Diego Aerospace Museum from 1963 to 1965; demolished in the 1960s for structural reasons and reconstructed using the original building as a model
 Electrical Building, originally built for the 1915 fair as the Commerce and Industries Building, renamed the Canadian Building in 1916; intended to be temporary; changed to the Palace of Better Housing for the 1935 fair; renamed Electrical Building after the fair; home of the San Diego Aerospace Museum from 1965 to 1978; burned down in 1978; reconstructed as Casa de Balboa
 San Diego Museum of Art, built in 1926 as the Fine Arts Gallery; built on the site of the 1915 Sacramento Valley Building, renamed the United States Building in 1916, which was intended to be temporary and was demolished in 1924
 San Diego Natural History Museum building, built in 1933 on the site of the 1915 Southern California Counties building, which was converted to a Civic Auditorium after the 1915 fair and burned down in 1925; during the 1935 fair the new building was called the Palace of Natural History

Map
This is a schematic map of the Panama-California Exposition as it appeared in its second year, 1916. The El Prado Complex corresponds to El Prado, the central avenue (gray), together with the buildings and plazas on either side of it. The blue area between it and the Cabrillo Bridge is the California Quadrangle, also listed on the National Register.

Gallery

References 

History of San Diego
Balboa Park (San Diego)
Bertram Goodhue buildings
Spanish Colonial Revival architecture in California
National Register of Historic Places in San Diego
World's fair architecture in California
Historic districts on the National Register of Historic Places in California
1935 establishments in California